Dimitrios Kapetanopoulos (born 12 April 1969) is a retired Greek football defender.

References

1969 births
Living people
Greek footballers
PAOK FC players
Iraklis Thessaloniki F.C. players
Kalamata F.C. players
Olympiacos Volos F.C. players
Kastoria F.C. players
Trikala F.C. players
Association football defenders
Super League Greece players
Footballers from Argos, Peloponnese